Peter Norman Fowler, Baron Fowler,  (born 2 February 1938) is a British politician who served as a member of both Margaret Thatcher and John Major's ministries during the 1980s and 1990s. He held the office of Lord Speaker from 1 September 2016 to 30 April 2021.

After serving as Shadow Minister of Transport, Fowler was appointed Minister of Transport in 1979, being responsible for making seat belts compulsory. Later, as Secretary of State for Health and Social Services, he drew public attention to the dangers of AIDS. He resigned from the cabinet as Employment Secretary, and was knighted in 1990.

Fowler was Chairman of the Conservative Party from 1992 to 1994, Shadow Secretary of State for Environment, Transport and the Regions from 1997 to 1998, and Shadow Home Secretary from 1998 to 1999. In 2001, he was created a Conservative life peer. He renounced party political allegiance upon taking office as Lord Speaker. On 25 February 2021, he announced that in April he would be stepping down as Lord Speaker to focus on campaigning work, particularly in relation to AIDS.

Early life
The son of Norman Frederick Fowler and Katherine (née Baker), he was educated at King Edward VI Grammar School in Chelmsford, Essex; after which he did National Service as a second lieutenant in the Essex Regiment. Whilst studying at Trinity Hall, Cambridge (BA Economics & Law 1961), he was Chairman of the Cambridge University Conservative Association in Michaelmas 1960, in which term he entertained both the Prime Minister Harold Macmillan and Home Secretary  Rab Butler. He then became a journalist, and worked on The Times.

Member of Parliament
Fowler was elected for Nottingham South in 1970; after the seat was abolished, he switched to Sutton Coldfield at the February 1974 election.

In opposition
During the mid-1970s, Fowler was Shadow Minister of Transport. In April 1976, he was photographed outside the Palace of Westminster having just taken delivery of his third four-cylinder MG MGB GT – he had reportedly rejected the idea of buying a V8 version on account of the cost.

In government
Upon Margaret Thatcher becoming Prime Minister in 1979, she did not immediately appoint Fowler to her Cabinet, explaining: "we were short of one place. As a result, Norman Fowler, as Minister of State at Transport, was not able to be an official member of the Cabinet, although he attended all our meetings."

As Secretary of State for Transport, Fowler drove through Lord Nugent's 1981 bill to make seat belts compulsory, a law that came into force in 1983.

As Secretary of State for Health and Social Security in 1986, Fowler implemented the first official drive to educate the British public to the dangers of AIDS. Edwina Currie (Health) and John Major (Social Security) both served under him as junior ministers.

Backbenches, retirement and Shadow Cabinet
Fowler later resigned from the Cabinet as Employment Secretary in January 1990; he later claimed that he was the first politician to cite "to spend more time with my [his] family" as his reason for leaving office, a phrase that has been reused by many others as a reason for a resignation and is often treated as a euphemism.

Following his resignation from the frontbench, Fowler was knighted in 1990.

Fowler then returned twice to front-line politics, first as Chairman of the Conservative Party (as a backbencher in Parliament) from 1992 to 1994, during which time he oversaw the parliamentary boundary changes of the early 1990s; then on the Conservative front bench as Shadow Secretary of State for Environment, Transport and the Regions (1997–98) and finally as Shadow Home Secretary (1998–99).

In 2001, Fowler stepped down as a Member of Parliament.

House of Lords

After standing down from the House of Commons, he entered the House of Lords, sitting on the Conservative benches as Baron Fowler, of Sutton Coldfield, in the County of West Midlands.

In 2003, Lord Fowler proposed that the European Union should appoint a high-level coordinator with ambassadorial rank to deal with the AIDS epidemic.

In 2006, he chaired a House of Lords select committee which criticised the use of the television licence fee, which is used to fund the BBC.

His book A Political Suicide (Politico's Publishing ) was published in 2008, and was shortlisted for the Channel 4 Political Book of the Year Award.

In May 2013, Fowler gave his support to legislation aiming to extend marriage rights to same-sex couples, stating: "Parliament should value people equally in the law, and that enabling same-sex couples to marry removes the current inequity."

He was elected as Lord Speaker in 2016. He is the third person and first man to hold the office since it was established by the Constitutional Reform Act 2005. Fowler has stated that he favours reducing the House of Lords to 600 members.

On 19 March 2020, during the COVID-19 pandemic he announced that he would be withdrawing from Westminster and remote working, with deputy speakers taking over his role in the House of Lords, but he returned in July to continue his role.

On 25 February 2021, Fowler announced that he would be stepping down ahead of the introduction of a series of structural and organisational changes and announced that it would be best if those changes were "seen through by the team who will be implementing them". He also stated his desire to stand down in order to "speak his mind" as an independent member of the House of Lords on issues he has campaigned for, in particular LGBT rights in the United Kingdom and HIV and AIDS. In March 2021, Fowler backed calls for the UK's first ever national AIDS memorial, with the aim of fighting stigma and discrimination against those with HIV and AIDS.

Private sector
Lord Fowler has served on the board of directors of several companies and is non-executive chairman of Aggregate Industries plc. He is a member of the National Union of Journalists.

Notes

References

External links
 Official website of the Lord Speaker
 
 "Europe should appoint Aids envoy, peer says" - a Guardian article by Michael White, dated 21 February 2003

|-

|-

|-

|-

|-

|-

|-

|-

|-

|-

1938 births
Military personnel from Chelmsford
Alumni of Trinity Hall, Cambridge
British Secretaries of State for Employment
Chairmen of the Conservative Party (UK)
Conservative Party (UK) life peers
Conservative Party (UK) MPs for English constituencies
British LGBT rights activists
Essex Regiment officers
Knights Bachelor
Living people
Lords Speaker
Members of the Bow Group
Members of the Privy Council of the United Kingdom
People educated at King Edward VI Grammar School, Chelmsford
People from Chelmsford
Secretaries of State for Health and Social Services
Secretaries of State for Transport (UK)
UK MPs 1970–1974
UK MPs 1974
UK MPs 1974–1979
UK MPs 1979–1983
UK MPs 1983–1987
UK MPs 1987–1992
UK MPs 1992–1997
UK MPs 1997–2001
Life peers created by Elizabeth II
Politicians awarded knighthoods